Saint Joseph Central Catholic High School (SJCC) is a private, Roman Catholic high school in Fremont, Ohio.  It is part of the Roman Catholic Diocese of Toledo. Athletic teams are known as the "Crimson Streaks".

History 
1896 – St. Joseph Central Catholic is founded. A brick house on the northeast corner of Croghan and Wood streets was purchased, remodeled and used as a high school facility until it was torn down in 1907 to make way for a new building.
1908 – A new building was completed at an estimated cost of $80,000 (nearly 2,000,000 in 2017).
1918 – Marked the beginning of the athletic tradition at St. Joseph High School with an athletic association created in September and the first basketball team organized that fall.
1957 – A new High School only building was completed on the corner of Croghan and North Clover Streets. The former building was used as St. Joseph Elementary School, with the new high school located next door.
2011 – The three Catholic Elementary Schools in Fremont (St. Ann, St. Joseph & Sacred Heart) along with SJCC High School were consolidated into one school system named Bishop Hoffman Catholic Schools. The name was chosen to honor the late Bishop James Hoffman, a native of Fremont, who served as bishop from 1981 until his death in 2003. Under this configuration, Grades Pre-K through 3rd were located at the former Sacred Heart Elementary building, Grades 4–8 were located at the former St. Joseph Elementary building and the High School (Grades 9–12) remained the same. The former St. Ann Elementary building was closed.
2015 – Reconfiguration of Bishop Hoffman Catholic Schools resulted in the closing of the aging St. Joseph Elementary building that served students for 107 years. In the new configuration, grades Pre-K through 6th are at the Sacred Heart Campus. Grades 7–8 are at the newly created Bishop Hoffman Junior High Academy located inside the high school building. The high school students, grades 9–12, remain in the high school building.
2019 - The building constructed in 1908 was demolished to create space for the St. Joseph Central Catholic school's current needs.
2022- The School continues to decline and seems to be in danger of closing in the very near future.

Athletics

Sports offered
Football
Cross Country
Golf
Tennis
Volleyball
Basketball
Band 
Cheerleading
Bowling
Baseball
Softball
Swimming
Track and Field
Wrestling

League membership
Sandusky Bay Conference, 1948–1986, 2016–Present
Midland Athletic League, 1986–2014
Sandusky River League, 2014–2016

Notable state finishes
Baseball
1988 - Division IV Final Four
2004 - Division IV Final Four
2007 - Division IV Final Four
Cross Country
2001 - Boys Division III 3rd Place
Football
1974 - Class A Runner-Up
1978 - Class A Final Four
Golf (Boys)
1990 - Division III Runner-Up
1991 - Division III Runner-Up
1992 - Division III Runner-Up
1993 - Division III Runner-Up
Track (Boys)
1993 - Division III Runner-Up

Notable alumni
 Mark Coleman, retired mixed martial artist UFC Hall of Fame member
 Tom Beier, American Football
 Curt Gonya, Youngstown State Penguins football star and leading logistics sales executive.

References

External links
 

Catholic secondary schools in Ohio
High schools in Sandusky County, Ohio
Educational institutions established in 1908
Buildings and structures in Fremont, Ohio
1908 establishments in Ohio